Crome's Broad is situated to the east of the River Ant, north of How Hill, within The Broads National Park in Norfolk, England.

It is named after John Crome, the founder of the Norwich School of painters.

Norfolk Broads
Ludham